Breitenau may refer to:

Breitenau, Germany, in Rhineland-Palatinate, Germany
Breitenau, a part of Bad Gottleuba-Berggießhübel in Saxony, Germany
Breitenau, Bas-Rhin, in Alsace, France
Breitenau, Austria, in Lower Austria, Austria
Breitenau am Hochlantsch, in Styria, Austria
Breitenau, a part of Guxhagen in Hesse, Germany
Breitenau monastery, in Guxhagen
Breitenau concentration camp, during Nazi Germany at the Breitenau monastery

See also
Breitnau